The Rockaway Park Shuttle is a New York City Subway shuttle train that operates in Queens. It connects with the  train at Broad Channel station and is the latest iteration of the Rockaway Shuttle services that have been running on the Rockaway peninsula since 1956. This shuttle train provides service to the western part of the peninsula, with a terminus at Rockaway Park–Beach 116th Street. The fully above-ground route operates on trackage that was originally part of the Long Island Rail Road's Far Rockaway Branch until the mid-1950s. During summer weekends, to eliminate an additional transfer and thus ease beach access, the Rockaway Park Shuttle is typically extended four stations north to Rockaway Boulevard, the southernmost station shared by Rockaway-bound and Lefferts Boulevard-bound A trains.

Like the other two shuttles, 42nd Street in Manhattan and Franklin Avenue in Brooklyn, it is marked with the letter "S" and its route bullet is colored  on route signs, station signs, rolling stock, and the official subway map. The internal designator for this service is H, though the MTA does not show this on any maps, train rollsigns, or schedules; the designation SR is also sometimes used on public documents.

Prior to 1993, the Rockaway Park Shuttle used multiple different designations, including the E, CC, and H, which had an emblem colored . The H formerly ran north to Euclid Avenue in Brooklyn via the IND Fulton Street Line, as well as to Far Rockaway–Mott Avenue to the east. In 2012–13, after Hurricane Sandy destroyed the IND Rockaway Line's connection to the rest of the system, the  H shuttle provided service from Far Rockaway–Mott Avenue to Beach 90th Street.

Service history 

The Rockaway Shuttle started operating on June 28, 1956. During its early years, it essentially provided non-rush hour and weekend service between Euclid Avenue and either Far Rockaway–Mott Avenue or Rockaway Park–Beach 116th Street.

Beginning on February 1, 1962, the Rockaway Shuttle was officially lettered on maps and trains as HH (which had last been used for the Court Street Shuttle, discontinued 16 years earlier) to make it easier to distinguish E trains from shuttle trains. From November 26, 1967, to September 10, 1972, it was colored red, with daytime non-rush hour and weekend service usually available between Rockaway Park and Euclid Avenue or Broad Channel, plus some weekday mid-afternoon service provided between Far Rockaway and Euclid Avenue.

During the late night-early morning hours, service operating to and from Euclid Avenue on the IND Fulton Street Line in Brooklyn was extended between roughly midnight and 6:00 a.m., which were the hours when the  did not run to and from Far Rockaway. At those times, the HH would operate from Euclid Avenue to Rockaway Park, then to Far Rockaway via Hammels Wye, and finally back to Euclid Avenue, thus earning this night owl service the unofficial nickname of Rockaway Round-Robin.

Afterward, the designation  (colored green) was used for the shuttle, running to Broad Channel, although during rush hours this train was extended all the way to Bedford Park Boulevard on the IND Concourse Line in the Bronx. In 1979, the MTA released a new coloring scheme for subway routes based on trunk line; CC service was assigned the color blue, because in Manhattan it used the IND Eighth Avenue Line. 

On May 6, 1985, the shuttle's identifier was changed to H (still colored blue) instead of reverting to HH, as the New York City subway system had abolished two-letter designations by then.

Prior to 1993, late night  service went to Lefferts Boulevard with no service to Far Rockaway. During this time again, the Rockaway Shuttle ran from Rockaway Park to Far Rockaway, to Euclid Avenue, and finally, back down to Rockaway Park. In 1993, service was changed. All late night  service traveled to Far Rockaway and service to Lefferts Boulevard was provided by a shuttle to Euclid Avenue. The Rockaway Park Shuttle, designated S, now ran between Rockaway Park and Broad Channel at all times. Also in 1993, special  diamond service began running from Rockaway Park to Manhattan during the morning rush, and from Manhattan to Rockaway Park during the evening rush.

Formerly, some maps and trains had shown the current S service in blue. Since May 2004, the official system map shows the Rockaway Park Shuttle as carrying a grey bullet. Recent prints, however, depicted the service itself in blue, but has been changed back to grey, as of January 2013. In order to distinguish it from the other shuttles, NYCT Rapid Transit operations still refers to it internally as the H.

 The Rockaway Park Shuttle was suspended following the aftermath of Hurricane Sandy, due to track being washed out between Broad Channel and Howard Beach. On November 20, 2012, a free shuttle designated as H replaced the Rockaway portion of the A service between Far Rockaway–Mott Avenue and Beach 90th Street via the Hammels Wye. Additionally, the remainder of the Rockaway Line from Beach 90th Street to Rockaway Park was damaged and awaited repair.  With the emergency implementation of this service, the H rollsign designation returned to public usage for the first time since 1993. Despite the service's free status, few riders used the signed H service, partly due to the extremely low ridership at Rockaway stations to begin with; this ridership had been lowered further since Hurricane Sandy. In addition, the service did not run during late nights, and the service was only connected to the rest of the subway via a shuttle bus to Howard Beach. On May 30, 2013, full service to the Rockaways was restored, and the free H service was discontinued.

In late May 2016, the MTA announced that the Rockaway Park Shuttle would be extended from Broad Channel to Rockaway Boulevard on weekends from mid-June until Labor Day 2016. This allowed passengers on both Lefferts Boulevard and Far Rockaway-bound trains to transfer to the shuttle, and for shuttle passengers to transfer to more frequent A train service at Rockaway Boulevard. The trains were also lengthened to eight cars instead of the usual four. This summer weekend extension was implemented again starting in 2017 between Memorial and Labor Days. However, the extension for 2018 ended on July 1 and was replaced by rerouted A trains to Rockaway Park due to construction on Hammels Wye. In 2019, the summer extension was reinstated for the whole season, while in 2020, the summer extension was reinstated in July. Since then, the seasonal extension has occurred on an annual basis.

From April 9 to May 18, 2018, and again from July 2 to September 3, 2018, the shuttle ran between Rockaway Park–Beach 116th Street and Far Rockaway–Mott Avenue due to a planned two-phase program of flood mitigation work along the Hammels Wye.

Stations 
For a more detailed station listing, see IND Rockaway Line.

References

External links 

 MTA NYC Transit – Rockaway Park Shuttle
 
 
 Archived at Ghostarchive and the Wayback Machine: 

Rockaway Park Shuttle